This page provides the summaries of the AFC first round matches for the 2010 FIFA World Cup qualification.

Format
In this round teams ranked 6–24 were randomly drawn against teams ranked 25–43, and the draw took place on 6 August 2007 in the AFC House in Kuala Lumpur, Malaysia. Teams ranked 1–5 received a bye to the third round.

The matches were held between 8 October 2007 and 30 October 2007. The 11 highest ranked teams (according to the first round seeding) among the 19 winners advanced to the third round of the Asian qualifiers, while the eight remaining teams advanced to the second round in November 2007.

Summary

|}

  For security reasons, Iraq played their home leg in Syria,  Palestine played their home leg in Qatar and Afghanistan played their home leg in Tajikistan.
  Bhutan withdrew.
  Guam withdrew.
  FIFA decided to move Myanmar home match to Malaysia.
  Timor-Leste elected to play their home leg in Indonesia.
  Palestine failed to appear; Singapore was awarded a 3–0 win. The Palestine Football Federation appealed to have the match rescheduled on the grounds that its players did not receive permits to leave the Gaza Strip, but FIFA dismissed the appeal.

Matches

Iraq won 7–0 on aggregate.

Uzbekistan won 11–0 on aggregate.

Thailand won 13–2 on aggregate.

Qatar won 6–0 on aggregate.

China PR won 11–0 on aggregate.

Bhutan withdrew.

2–2 on aggregate; Jordan won 6–5 on penalties.

United Arab Emirates won 6–0 on aggregate.

Bahrain won 4–1 on aggregate.

Hong Kong won 11–3 on aggregate.

Syria won 5–1 on aggregate.

Yemen won 3–2 on aggregate.

Tajikistan won 6–1 on aggregate.

Korea DPR won 9–2 on aggregate.

Oman won 4–0 on aggregate.

Singapore won 7–0 on aggregate.

Lebanon won 6–3 on aggregate.

Turkmenistan won 5–1 on aggregate.

Guam withdrew.

Qualified teams
Among the 19 winners, top 11 winners advanced to the third round while the remaining 8 teams advanced to second round.

Goalscorers
A total of 131 goals were scored over 33 games, for an average of 3.97 goals per game.
5 goals

 Sarayoot Chaikamdee
 Maksim Shatskikh

4 goals

 Cheng Siu Wai
 Mahdi Karim
 Mohammed Ghaddar
 Jong Chol-Min
 Numondzhon Khakimov

3 goals

 Chan Siu Ki
 Pak Chol-Min
 Sebastián Soria
 Ary

2 goals

 Liu Jian
 Qu Bo
 Sunil Chhetri
 Kin Seng Chan
 Sayed Ali Bechir
 Shi Jiayi
 Mohamed Al Zeno
 Teerasil Dangda
 Datsakorn Thonglao
 Artur Gevorkyan
 Mamedaly Karadanov

1 goal

 Obaidullah Karimi
 Mahmood Abdulrahman
 Abdulla Baba Fatadi
 A'ala Hubail
 Jaycee John Okwunwanne
 Zumratul Hossain Mithu
 Samel Nasa
 Du Zhenyu
 Li Jinyu
 Wu Wei'an
 Li Weifang
 Yang Lin
 Zhang Yaokun
 Zheng Bin
 Cheung Sai Ho
 Lam Ka Wai
 Lo Kwan Yee
 Steven Dias
 Nashat Akram
 Jassim Mohammed Ghulam
 Emad Mohammed
 Hatem Aqel
 Mahmoud Shelbaieh
 Aibek Bokoyev
 Cholponbek Esenku Uulu
 Roda Antar
 Mahmoud El Ali
 Mohd Bunyamin Omar
 Ali Ashfaq
 Shamveel Qasim
 Donorovyn Lkhümbengarav
 Odkhuu Selenge
 Jon Kwang-Ik
 Kim Kuk-Jin
 Mohamed Al Hinai
 Fawzi Bashir
 Hassan Mudhafar
 Hashim Saleh
 Saad Al-Shammari
 Mohd Noh Alam Shah
 John Wilkinson
 Maher Al Sayed
 Feras Esmaeel
 Aatef Jenyat
 Dzhomikhon Mukhiddinov
 Dilshod Vasiev
 Patiparn Phetphun
 Suree Sukha
 Nirut Surasiang
 Teeratep Winothai
 Mekan Nasyrov
 Nawaf Al-Darmaki
 Saeed Al-Kas
 Ahmed Mohammed Al-Mahri
 Mohamed Al-Shehhi
 Ismail Matar
 Basheer Saeed
 Ulugbek Bakayev
 Islom Inomov
 Timur Kapadze
 Victor Karpenko
 Shavkat Salomov
 Ilhomjon Suyunov
 Fekri Al-Hubaishi
 Mohammed Salem
 Haitham Thabit

1 own goal
 Alfredo Esteves (playing against Hong Kong)

Notes

References

1
Qual